Alain Razahasoa (born 30 March 1966) is a Malagasy long-distance runner. He competed in the men's marathon at the 1992 Summer Olympics.

References

1966 births
Living people
Athletes (track and field) at the 1992 Summer Olympics
Malagasy male long-distance runners
Malagasy male marathon runners
Olympic athletes of Madagascar
Place of birth missing (living people)